Julia Huxley (née Arnold; 1862–1908) was a British scholar. She founded Prior's Field School for girls, in Godalming, Surrey in 1902.

Life
Born Julia Arnold in 1862 to Julia Arnold (née Sorell), the granddaughter of William Sorell, and Thomas Arnold, a literary scholar,  she was the niece of critic Matthew Arnold and author and colonial administrator William Delafield Arnold and the sister of Mary Augusta Ward (Mrs Humphry Ward), the writer and journalist William Thomas Arnold, and the suffrage campaigner Ethel Arnold. 

She met Lewis Carroll as a child and she and her sister Ethel featured in a number of his photographs. Ethel later reported that she enjoyed the attention as a break from her less than happy home life. Ethel was to remain friends with Lewis Carroll as an adult. For Christmas in 1877, Lewis Carroll devised the word game of Doublets for Julia and Ethel. The game was later published by Vanity Fair and by Carroll.

She went to Somerville College, Oxford where she was awarded a First in English Literature in 1882. Julia married Leonard Huxley in 1885.

In January, 1902, Julia Huxley founded a remarkable school which was Prior's Field School for girls, in Godalming, Surrey. The school started with a five-acre (2 ha) plot and a moderately sized house designed by C.F.A. Voysey, Julia Huxley opened her school with herself as head with one boarder, five day girls, Miss English, Mademoiselle Bonnet, a wire-haired terrier and her -year-old son, Aldous.

As head she taught her charges to enjoy culture and solitude and to be bibliophiles. She was a clever and talented teacher who had a relaxed discipline.

Death and legacy
She died, at the age of 46, of cancer in 1908. At that time she had been headmistress for six years. In June 1908 her school had 85 pupils and 86 "Old Girls". She was succeeded as headmistress by Ethel Burton-Brown, who had been her manager.

Huxley's funeral service took place in the Watts Cemetery Chapel and she was buried close to one of it walls. The pupils from the school attended the service. Leonard Huxley and her son Aldous's ashes would also be buried there.

In March 2017 the school she founded opened a new Science, Technology and Music Centre, named the Arnold Building, in memory of her.

Private life
Julia and Leonard Huxley married in 1885 and had four children together: Julian Sorell Huxley (1887-1975), Noel Trevenen (or Trevelyan) Huxley (1889-1914), the novelist Aldous Leonard Huxley (1894-1963) and Margaret Arnold Huxley (1899-1981). Julia wrote a letter to Aldous as she was dying and he carried this with him for the rest of his life. It included the thought "Judge not too much and love more". Scholars of Aldous's works can see his mother's death in his cynical attitude and his books including Eyeless in Gaza, Brave New World and the Utopian Island.

References

Heads of schools in England
Alumni of Somerville College, Oxford
Julia
1862 births
1908 deaths
Founders of British schools and colleges